Uncial 0158 (in the Gregory-Aland numbering), α 1039 (in the Soden numbering), is a Greek uncial manuscript of the New Testament, dated palaeographically to the 5th century (or 6th century).

Description 
The codex contains a small part of the Epistle to the Galatians 1:1-13, on one parchment leaf (30 cm by 22 cm). Written in two columns per page, 25 lines per page, in uncial letters. It is a palimpsest, the upper text is in Arabic. 

The text-type of this codex is unknown. Kurt Aland did not place it in any of Categories of New Testament manuscripts.

It is dated by the Institute for New Testament Textual Research to the 5th or 6th century.

The codex used to be held in Qubbat al-Khazna in Damascus. The present location of the codex is unknown. The manuscript is not accessible.

See also 

 List of New Testament uncials
 Textual criticism

References 

 

Greek New Testament uncials
5th-century biblical manuscripts 
Palimpsests
Lost biblical manuscripts